Tony Lippett (born July 2, 1992) is an American football cornerback who is a free agent. He played college football at Michigan State, and was drafted by the Miami Dolphins in the fifth round of the 2015 NFL Draft.

Early years
Lippett attended Crockett High School in Detroit, Michigan, where he was a two-sport star in both football and track. He was a three-year starter on both sides of the ball (quarterback and cornerback) for the Crockett Rockets high school football team. As a junior in 2008, Lippett registered 36 tackles (32 solos, 4 assists) and three interceptions as a defensive back. On offense, he accounted for 2,749 total yards and 23 touchdowns. He completed 157-of-219 throws for 1,967 yards, 13 touchdowns, and 12 interceptions, and carried the ball 87 times for 782 yards and 10 more scores in 2008. As a senior in 2009, Lippett was an Associated Press (AP) All-State selection as a defensive back after recording 55 tackles (36 solos, 19 assists) and nine interceptions (45 return yards). On offense, he accounted for 3,014 total yards and 30 touchdowns while leading the Rockets to a 10-2 record. He completed 116-of-187 passes for 2,066 yards, 17 touchdowns and six interceptions, while also rushing 105 times for 948 yards and 13 more scores, earning All-Metro Detroit honors. He represented the East squad in the 2010 Michigan High School All-Star Game, played June 19 in Spartan Stadium, and led all receivers with four catches for 95 yards.

Also a standout track & field athlete, Lippett competed as a sprinter during his junior and senior seasons, participating in the sprint relays and the open 100m and 200-meters for Crockett. As a junior, he was 2nd in the 200-meter dash in the city (22.39 s) and the 4th in the state (23.06 s). He clocked a personal-best of 10.7 seconds in the 100-meter dash prior to his senior season, and was also timed routinely at 4.5 seconds in the 40-yard dash.

Lippett is a cousin of former New England Patriots cornerback Ronnie Lippett.

Recruiting
Lippett was rated among the nation's top wide receivers by Scout.com (No. 62). He was named to SuperPrep's and PrepStar's All-Midwest Teams. He was listed among the state's top seniors by Scout.com (No. 13), Detroit Free Press (No. 13), Lansing State Journal (No. 16), The Detroit News (No. 17) and Rivals.com (No. 19).

College career
Lippett started his career at Michigan State University as a cornerback. After he was redshirted as a freshman in 2010, Lippett appeared in all 14 games in 2011 with five starts. He finished the year with 18 tackles and four receptions for 44 yards. Prior to his sophomore season in 2012, he was moved to wide receiver full-time. He finished with 36 receptions for 392 yards and two touchdowns in 13 games. As a junior in 2013, he started 10 of 14 games and had a team-leading 44 receptions with 613 yards and two touchdowns. Lippett remained a starter his senior season in 2014. He had 65 receptions for 1,198 yards with 11 touchdowns and was named a first-team All-Big Ten selection.

College statistics

Professional career

Miami Dolphins
Lippett was drafted by the Miami Dolphins in the fifth round (156th overall) of the 2015 NFL Draft.

Lippett became a starter in his second season after primarily playing on special teams as a rookie. He started 13 games, finished fourth on the team with 67 tackles, second on the team with four passes defensed, and leading the team with four interceptions.

In training camp in 2017, Lippett suffered a torn Achilles and was ruled out for the season. He was placed on injured reserve on September 2, 2017.

On September 1, 2018, Lippett was released by the Dolphins.

New York Giants
On October 25, 2018, Lippett was signed by the New York Giants.

On March 14, 2019, Lippett re-signed with the Giants. He was released on July 24, 2019.

Cincinnati Bengals
On July 30, 2019, Lippett signed with the Cincinnati Bengals. He was waived during final roster cuts on August 30, 2019.

Saskatchewan Roughriders
Lippett signed with the Saskatchewan Roughriders of the CFL on May 4, 2020. He was placed on the suspended list on July 3, 2021.

References

External links
Michigan State Spartans bio

1992 births
Living people
Crockett High School (Michigan) alumni
Players of American football from Detroit
American football wide receivers
American football cornerbacks
Michigan State Spartans football players
Miami Dolphins players
New York Giants players
Cincinnati Bengals players
Saskatchewan Roughriders players